Panchayat Prajatantra Party is a Nepalese political party. It is a small far-right party. On November 8, 2002 it joined the Nationalist Democratic Front together with Nepal Samata Party, Deshbhakta Prajatantrik Party, National Janamukti Party, Rastrabadi Milan Kendra and Rashtriya Prajatantra Party (Nationalist).

Political parties in Nepal